Plonk is a term used primarily in Commonwealth English for generally cheap, low-quality wine. It is believed to come from Australian slang, in reference to blanc (the French word for "white"), before it became naturalised in Britain.  Despite the reference to the colour white, the term is not limited to white wine, and can as easily indicate a red wine or rosé. In this context, the phrase has even spawned the title of a novel which evokes the perceived tackiness of the 1980s. 

In Australia, plonk packaged and sold in a cask or simply in a bag is commonly called "goon".

The term has also been adopted in other Commonwealth countries, particularly in Canada.

Other usages
The term is not always used in a wholly derogatory manner. It can indicate a degree of strange affection for the wine in question. Telegraph journalist Max Davidson has equated plonk with "youth, ... excess, ... self-indulgence in times of penury. Forget grown-up wine. With plonk, the sweetest bouquet of all is the taste of a few pence saved."

Today, the term can often be used to indicate that a particular social gathering is not a fancy affair. For example, if a party guest is worried about the social level of the occasion, a host might assuage his or her concerns with the phrase: "Oh, just bring a bottle of plonk." Indeed, probably the most famous literary use of "plonk" comes in Willy Russell's play Educating Rita. Working-class Rita decides she cannot attend a party to which academic Frank has invited her, since she is ashamed of the wine she has bought and feels out-of-place. When Rita reports her anxieties to Frank the following week, he castigates Rita for being too self-conscious, reassuring her: "It wouldn't have mattered if you'd walked in carrying a bottle of Spanish plonk."

Another well-known usage of the word was that of Horace Rumpole, the title character of John Mortimer's television series "Rumpole of the Bailey" (1975–1992). Rumpole would frequently suggest to a fellow barrister, and sometimes even a client, that they repair to Pomeroy's Wine Bar, to down a few glasses of plonk.

See also
Box wine
Flavored fortified wine
Jabol
Jug wine

References

Wine terminology
English words
https://sjmc.gov.au/wine-in-war-the-origins-of-plonk/